This was the first edition of the tournament.

Filip Krajinović won the title after defeating Laslo Đere 6–0, 6–3 in the final.

Seeds

Draw

Finals

Top half

Bottom half

References

External links
Main draw
Qualifying draw

Almaty Challenger - Singles